Mahrugi, also rendered as Mahruqi, may refer to:
 Mahrugi-ye Olya
 Mahrugi-ye Sofla